The men's 5000 metres in speed skating at the 1968 Winter Olympics took place on 15 February, at the L'Anneau de Vitesse.

Records
Prior to this competition, the existing world and Olympic records were as follows:

The following new world record was set.

Results

References

Men's speed skating at the 1968 Winter Olympics